Dąbrowa Białostocka  is a town in Sokółka County, Podlaskie Voivodeship, Poland.  It used to be in Białystok Voivodeship (1975-1998).

As of December 2021, the town has a population of 5,305.

Notable people
 Peter Sidorkiewicz, National Hockey League player

References

Cities and towns in Podlaskie Voivodeship
Sokółka County
Trakai Voivodeship
Sokolsky Uyezd
Białystok Voivodeship (1919–1939)
Belastok Region